IGF may stand for:
 Insulin-like growth factor
 Independent Games Festival
 Internet Governance Forum
 Identity Governance Framework
 Inoki Genome Federation
 International Golf Federation
 International Genetics Federation
 International Graphical Federation, a former global union federation
 Israeli Ground Forces
 International Go Federation
 Induced gas flotation